Lee In-Sook (born 8 April 1950) is a South Korean former volleyball player who competed in the women's tournament at the 1972 Summer Olympics. The team finished in 4th place.

References

1950 births
Living people
South Korean women's volleyball players
Olympic volleyball players of South Korea
Volleyball players at the 1972 Summer Olympics
Asian Games medalists in volleyball
Volleyball players at the 1970 Asian Games
Medalists at the 1970 Asian Games
Asian Games silver medalists for South Korea